Sobětuchy is a village and part of Tuřice in Mladá Boleslav District in the Central Bohemian Region of the Czech Republic. It has about 80 inhabitants.

Geography
Sobětuchy lies on the right bank of the Jizera River.

Transport
The D10 motorway runs just next to the territory of Sobětuchy.

References

Populated places in Mladá Boleslav District